Lágrimas Mexicanas is an album by guitarists Vinicius Cantuária and Bill Frisell which was released on the French Naïve label.

Reception
The Allmusic review by Thom Jurek called it "a completely unique collection of songs that draws heavily from traditional Latin and Brazilian rhythms, and weds them to 21st century jazz improvisation and sonic effects in a luxuriant braid of colors, textures, styles, and languages" awarding the album 4 stars stating "Lágrimas Mexicana is an ambitious yet utterly accessible album ... It is at once warm, sexy, and visionary. It presents two different yet very complementary artists in a collaboration that borders on brilliant". On All About Jazz Mark F. Turner noted "Influenced by New York City's diverse Spanish-speaking culture, the timing was right for Cantuária and Frisell, who had worked together in the past, to fully develop the project. Their unique hybrid, which includes improvisational music and songs with lyrics mixed in Portuguese, Spanish, and English, is at once intriguing, yet surprisingly mellow". In JazzTimes, Josef Woodard wrote "It may have been inevitable that Frisell would sooner or later turn his musical energies toward Brazil. Both Brazilian music and Frisell-ian music operate in the expressive areas where lyricism and experimental instincts meet and often thrive".

Track listing
All compositions by Vinicius Cantuária and Bill Frisell
 "Mi Declaración" – 7:03
 "Calle 7" – 5:03
 "La Curva" – 2:34
 "Lágrimas Mexicanas" – 4:35
 "Lágrimas de Amor" – 5:00
 "Cafezinho" – 1:37
 "El Camino" – 3:31
 "Aquela Mulher" – 5:10
 "Briga de Namorados" – 4:40
 "Forinfas" – 1:55

Personnel
Vinicius Cantuária – vocals, percussion, acoustic guitar
Bill Frisell – acoustic guitar, electric guitar, loops

References 

2011 albums
Bill Frisell albums
Vinicius Cantuária albums
Naïve Records albums